Rahma Ghars (born 4 November 1994) is a Tunisian women's football defender. She played in the Turkish Women's First Football League for Ataşehir Belediyespor with jersey number 5. She was a member of the Tunisia national team.

Private life
Rahma Ghars was born in Tunisia on 4 November 1994.

Playing career

Club
Ghars moved to Turkey and joined the Istanbul-based team Ataşehir Belediyespor on 24 October 2018. She appeared in six matches of the first half of the 2018–19 Turkish Women's First Football League season.

International
Ghars was a member of the Tunisia women's national football team at the 2016 Africa Women Cup of Nations qualification matches.

Career statistics
.

See also
List of Tunisia women's international footballers

References

1994 births
Living people
Tunisian women's footballers
Women's association football defenders
Ataşehir Belediyespor players
Turkish Women's Football Super League players
Tunisia women's international footballers
Tunisian expatriate footballers
Tunisian expatriate sportspeople in Turkey
Expatriate women's footballers in Turkey
20th-century Tunisian women
21st-century Tunisian women